Bob Golub (born September 6, 1957) is an American comedian, actor, writer, and filmmaker of Polish descent, whose work is largely inspired from his true-life childhood experiences of growing up in a dysfunctional home located in the steel-mill town of Farrell, Pennsylvania.

Career
Bob Golub began his career as a stand-up comedian in the 1980s following a two-year prison term for cocaine dealing, appearing in various clubs in New York City, Pittsburgh, Miami, Las Vegas and Los Angeles. His intensely profane and candid style has, over the years, landed him featured roles in such films as Goodfellas, Art School Confidential, The Glass Beads, Johnny Virus, The Kings of Brooklyn, and The Watermelon. Golub's self-written, self-directed independent feature docu-comedy Dodo is a unique synthesis of taped live performance, professionally shot auto-biographical recreations of past events, and hundreds of hours of home video featuring himself and his family. Originally a one-man show, Dodo derives its title from the nickname given to Golub's deceased father who, having lost an eye in a freak childhood baseball accident, was unable obtain work in the local steel mills of Farrel, Pennsylvania. With no real skills, Dodo began a family roof-repair business which provided some income.

In both the one-man show and film of the same name, Dodo is portrayed as an angry and frustrated alcoholic, who routinely beat his wife and children. For Golub himself, the only real way to avoid beatings was to become funny enough to make his father laugh in spite of his anger, thus deflecting violence. Bob Golub's one-man show ran just over an hour, and toured America from 2003 to 2006, receiving large audiences and highly supportive reviews.

The film version of Dodo was released in the year 2010, by Celebrity Video Distribution.

Selected filmography

References

External links

YouTube trailer for 
YouTube clip from 
YouTube trailer for 
Bob Golub Official Website
Bob Golub Entertainers Worldwide Profile

American filmmakers
American male film actors
Living people
1957 births
American people of Polish descent
People from Sharon, Pennsylvania
20th-century American comedians
21st-century American comedians
Comedians from Pennsylvania